Sir Harry Livesey GBE (30 May 1860 – 21 June 1932) was a British civil engineer.

Livesey served as Deputy Director of Inland Waterways and Docks at the War Office from August 1916 to May 1917, when he became Director of Contracts at the Admiralty, holding the post until December 1918.

He was appointed Knight Commander of the Order of the British Empire (KBE) in 1918 and Knight Grand Cross of the Order of the British Empire (GBE) in the 1920 civilian war honours.

He built Trull's Hatch, originally as a stud farm on his father's estate in Rotherfield and later as his own country house and owned Ascot Place from 1907 to 1911. He died in Monte Carlo aboard his yacht Jeannette on 21 June 1932.

Footnotes

References
Obituary, The Times, 22 June 1932

1860 births
1932 deaths
British civil engineers
Civil servants in the War Office
Civil servants in the Admiralty
Knights Grand Cross of the Order of the British Empire
People from Winkfield
People from Rotherfield